The Big Pelican is one of Australia's big things and a popular tourist attraction. The Big Pelican is located on the foreshore of the Noosa River in Noosaville, Queensland on the Sunshine Coast. It is a popular spot for families to visit and take photos, as well as enjoy the surroundings and atmosphere.

References 

Tourist attractions on the Sunshine Coast, Queensland
Big things in Queensland